The Bowmanville POW camp also known as Camp 30 was a Canadian-run POW camp for German soldiers during World War II located in the community of Bowmanville, Ontario in Clarington, Ontario, Canada (2020 Lambs Road).  In September 2013, the camp was designated a National Historic Site of Canada.

In 1943, prisoners Otto Kretschmer and Wolfgang Heyda were the subject of an elaborate escape attempt named Operation Kiebitz.

Early history

The camp was built as the Bowmanville Boys Training School. Two of the early buildings were completed in 1927. The property taught boys until 1941, 14 years after it first opened as a school, when the government told the school to move to a new location so the area could be quickly turned into a prisoner of war (P.O.W) camp. Bowmanville Boys Training School was relocated within Bowmanville to "Rathskamoray" (currently the Lion's Centre), although most boys returned home.
 
Canadian officials had barely seven months to turn the boys' school into a prisoner-of-war (POW) camp. The school was built to hold many people, but the officials had many tasks to complete before prisoners could be moved in: building barb-wire fences 15 feet apart, guard towers (nine), as well as gates and barracks for the Canadian guards. These tasks were completed in late 1941, just as the prisoners were arriving.
 
After the war ended, the POWs were shipped back to Europe, and the site resumed its use as a school.

Battle of Bowmanville

In October 1942, between 1,500 and 4,000 prisoners revolted against the POW guards after some of the prisoners were shackled as retribution as part of the escalation of Germany's new Commando Order.

Lieutenant-colonel James Taylor had asked German senior officer Georg Friemel to supply 100 prisoners to volunteer to be shackled as part of the ongoing international dispute.  When he refused, Otto Kretschmer and Hans Hefele were also asked to provide volunteers, but refused.

Taylor ordered the guards to find 100 officers to be shackled by force, and Horst Elfe, Kretschmer and others barricaded themselves in the mess hall, arming themselves with sticks, iron bars and other makeshift weapons.  Approximately 100 Canadian soldiers requisitioned from another base in Kingston arrived, and together stormed the mess hall using only ice hockey sticks, so the two sides remained evenly matched.  After several hours of brawling, the Canadians brought high pressure water hoses and soaked the cabin thoroughly until the prisoners agreed to come out peacefully.

During later incidents in the battle which spanned several days, Volkmar König was wounded by gunfire and another prisoner was bayoneted, and a Canadian soldier suffered a skull fracture from a thrown jar of jam.  After calm had returned, 126 of the prisoners were transferred to other camps.

Escape attempts

During the years the site was used as a prisoner of war camp, there were many escape attempts; even though it was said the prisoners were treated better than most citizens of Bowmanville and the surrounding area.

The first escape came shortly after the camp opened on November 23, 1941.  Ulrich Steinhilper escaped through the wire and was on the run for two days before being recaptured.  He would escape again a few weeks later and be recaptured again.  His last attempt was February 18, 1942.  After recapture he was moved to Camp 20. 
November 25, 1941. A prisoner attempted to crawl underneath the barbed wire, but was caught immediately and given a 28-day detention.
Operation Kiebitz - failed escape attempt to rescue four German submarine commanders.
On December 30, 1941 a prisoner attempted an escape by hiding in the laundry truck as it was leaving the camp. The attempt failed, and he was held in the Oshawa Jail for a few hours before being released into the camp that same day.
During a routine inspection in the prisoner's cells, a tin can was found with a map and tools to escape, on the 29 July 1943. The can was taken and likely either locked away, or destroyed.
It is said the most notorious escape attempts were that in which the P.O.W's tried to build tunnels. Several were attempted, and when found were stopped and closed off. The most famous tunnel attempt was started in the North-east corner of Victoria Hall (referred to by prisoners as Haus IV). The tunnel was 50cmX50cm squared, lighting had been wired in, and a ventilation system installed using tin cans. Supports were every 1–2 meters and were made from wood from attics within the camp. The dirt excavated was disposed of using a trolley system, and men passing a bucket up to the attic through a hole in the ceiling. In September 1943 the attic floor collapsed from the weight of the accumulated dirt. Alerted guards discovered the tunnel and collapsed it.

Present day

The property remained as a boys' training school until 1979 and various academic uses until 2008 (school for overseas Malaysian students, St. Stephen's Catholic Secondary School and finally a private Islamic university).

After 2008, the P.O.W. Camp 30 was greatly neglected. Buildings are boarded up, doors are blocked by dirt, or are also boarded up. All windows are broken, and interiors of the buildings are badly damaged with graffiti covering the walls, and drywall smashed. Most are also considered dangerous or a fire hazard (there is fire damage within all of the biggest buildings), but some remain in fairly good condition, with minimal water damage.

In 2013, Camp 30 received a spot on Heritage Canada's list for 'The top 10 endangered places of 2013' mainly because it was scheduled to be demolished, due to neglect of the buildings, and the value of the land to a developer. This demolition plan was cancelled later in 2013, after it was named a National Historic Site. Most agree that the site should be saved, but at the moment it is undecided what will be done with the property. "All we want to see is reuse of the buildings... some people want a big, beautiful museum, we understand the finances aren't there. We just want to see adaptive reuse" the president of ACO Clarington, Tracey Ali, said to the Clarington newspaper. The estimated amount to restore all buildings could go as high as Canadian $15,000,000.

The Clarington paper also reported of how a committee was created September 9, 2013 to look at how the buildings could be saved, and how they will be preserved. A heritage plaque is expected to be put up, given its landmark designation.

The site is currently in poor condition, vandalized, abandoned and neglected.

Today the cafeteria is little more than a brick shell, although the building's original freezer remains intact. Also, the basement has the remains of two boilers.

On July 5, 2016, the Municipality of Clarington announced that they had completed a purchase agreement with the current owners of the property, Kaitlin Developments and Fandor Homes.

This move has effectively saved the site from eventual destruction by a combination of vandalism, inadequate funding, and eventual home development.  The sale included a $500,000 donation to the Municipality to assist in the maintenance and care of the property in conjunction with an initial site cleanup.  The cleanup will involve destroying buildings that have not received a historical status, cleaning up graffiti, and the installation of security cameras. As of 2021, the site remains in disrepair with no cleanup efforts initiated.

References

Sources
 

O'Meara, J. (2013, Sept). Camp 30 set to take its place in history. Clarington

External links

Bowmanville POW camp information
Bowmanville POW camp information
Camp 30 - Ontario Abandoned Places
Durham Region
Hitlers Canadians

World War II prisoner-of-war camps in Canada
Military history of Canada during World War II
Buildings and structures in Clarington
National Historic Sites in Ontario